Broderick Soncuaco Pabillo (born March 11, 1955) is a Filipino prelate who has been the Vicar Apostolic of Taytay in Palawan since 2021. He was appointed by Pope Francis to that post on June 29, 2021, and was installed on August 19 by Socrates C. Mesiona, Vicar Apostolic of Puerto Princesa, Palawan. He previously served as auxiliary bishop of Manila from 2006 to 2021 and apostolic administrator of that archdiocese from February 2020 to June 2021.

Biography 
Broderick Soncuaco Pabillo was born in Victorias, Negros Occidental, on March 11, 1955, to Conrado Cordova Pabillo and Gloria Acuña Suncuaco. He attended primary school at St. Joseph School in Naga, Camarines Sur and secondary school at Don Bosco Juniorate in San Fernando, Pampanga. He obtained his bachelor of science degree in industrial education at Don Bosco College, Canlubang in 1977. In 1974, he entered the novitiate of the Salesians of Don Bosco of Canlubang, Calamba, Laguna. He made his perpetual vows on April 1, 1981. He obtained a bachelor's degree in theology at the University of Santo Tomas in Manila and a licentiate in sacred scripture at the Pontifical Gregorian University in Rome. He was ordained a priest by Cardinal Jaime Sin, Archbishop of Manila, on December 8, 1982.

He served as the parochial vicar of St. Ildefonso Parish in Makati from 1986 to 1987. He also served as rector of the Don Bosco Seminary in Parañaque from 1996 to 1999 and later the parish priest of St. Ezekiel Moreno Parish Church in Puerto Princesa from 1999 to 2006.

On May 24, 2006, Pope Benedict XVI appointed him as Auxiliary Bishop of Manila and Titular Bishop of Sitifis. He was consecrated bishop on August 19, 2006, by Manila archbishop Cardinal Gaudencio B. Rosales. The co-consecrators were Apostolic Nuncio to the Philippines Archbishop Fernando Filoni and Pedro D. Arigo, Apostolic Vicar of Palawan.

On February 10, 2020, with the departure of Cardinal Luis Antonio Tagle following his appointment as the Prefect of the Congregation for the Evangelization of Peoples, Pabillo was appointed by Pope Francis as the apostolic administrator of the Archdiocese of Manila. He held that until June 24, 2021, when Cardinal Jose Advincula was installed as Tagle's successor.

On July 23, 2020, Pabillo disclosed that he tested positive for COVID-19, following the release of the result of his RT-PCR test. He was an asymptomatic carrier. He recovered from the disease as he was tested negative in August. 

On June 29, 2021, Pope Francis appointed him as Vicar Apostolic of Taytay. He was canonically installed on August 19, 2021, on his 15th episcopal ordination anniversary.

References 

1955 births
Living people
Bishops appointed by Pope Benedict XVI
Filipino Roman Catholics
Salesian bishops
Filipino Roman Catholic bishops
Pontifical Gregorian University alumni